Chima Nwosu  (born 12 May 1986) was a female Nigerian football defender.

She was part of the Nigeria women's national football team  at the 2004 Summer Olympics. On club level she played for Inneh Queens.

See also
 Nigeria at the 2004 Summer Olympics

References

External links
 
 http://www.socceramerica.com/article/5912/olympics-women39s-soccer-rosters.html
 http://womenssoccerafrica.blogspot.com/2011/08/home-based-super-falcons-given-august.html
http://content.usatoday.com/sports/olympics/athens/results.aspx?rsc=FBW400E03&ru=N
 http://www.gettyimages.com/detail/news-photo/laenderspiel-2004-offenbach-deutschland-nigeria-chima-nwosu-news-photo/52508225#fussball-frauen-laenderspiel-2004-offenbach-deutschland-nigeria-chima-picture-id52508225

1986 births
Living people
Nigerian women's footballers
Place of birth missing (living people)
Footballers at the 2004 Summer Olympics
Olympic footballers of Nigeria
Women's association football defenders
Nigeria women's international footballers
Igbo people